The Boy Friend is a 1971 British musical comedy film written and directed by Ken Russell, based on the 1953 musical of the same name by Sandy Wilson. The film stars Twiggy, Christopher Gable, Tommy Tune, and Max Adrian, with an uncredited appearance by Glenda Jackson. MGM made extensive edits to the film for its American release. The missing material was restored and the film was re-released in 1987. The Boy Friend was released on DVD on 12 April 2011.

Plot
The plot is divided into three levels.

First there is the frame story, where, in the south of England in the 1920s, a struggling theatrical troupe is performing a musical about romantic intrigues at a finishing school for young women in the south of France. As well as weathering ongoing backstage dramas, and audiences that are smaller in number than the cast, two extra stressors arrive: a famous Hollywood film producer turns up to see the show, and Polly, the mousy assistant stage manager, is forced to go on when the leading lady breaks a leg. As Polly struggles to keep her cool while acting opposite the male lead whom she secretly loves, the rest of the company backstab each other as they try to impress the impresario.

Next there is the musical itself. Four of the girls at the school are very forward and acquire boy friends, but Polly is shy and has nobody to take her to the carnival masked ball that night. Tony, a messenger boy from a dress shop, brings her a costume and the two young people are struck with each other. They meet again in the afternoon and reach an understanding, she pretending to be only a secretary, so as not to seem above him socially. He comes to the ball and, when unmasked, is recognised as a peer's son. So Tony and Polly are both rich and can marry openly.

Thirdly, there are extensive fantasy sequences in the film, during which the characters' dreams and hopes are enacted in music and dance without words.

Cast

Production

Development
The musical premiered on stage in November 1954 and had been a notable success, running for over five years in London and helping make a star of Julie Andrews. MGM bought the film rights in February 1957. Ernie Martin and Cy Feur were attached to produce with the cast to include either Debbie Reynolds or Carol Channing. New songs were to be added, and some of the script changed. In January 1958, they announced the film would be made that year with Debbie Reynolds. However the film was not made.

In February 1961, Reynolds said the project was one of three at MGM she would "love to do" (the others being Jumbo and The Elsie Janis Story) but "they're just not making musicals these days."

A few years later, Ross Hunter, who had tried to buy the project originally but had been outbid by MGM, offered to buy the rights from the studio but it wanted $450,000 for it. Hunter decided to make his own musical in the same vein resulting in Thoroughly Modern Millie.

In June 1970, MGM and EMI announced they would make four films together, with each company putting in £1 million. The movies were Get Carter, The Go-Between, The Last Run and The Boy Friend. Robert Littman was head of MGM's European operations. The film was made after Get Carter and The Go Between and was the first movie from the newly formed EMI-MGM Film Productions Ltd.

Dan Ireland thought Russell was motivated to make the film in part in response to the controversy of The Devils (1971). Russell admitted he did it "to prove to people I'm not totally deranged. I love the innocence and charm of musicals."

Filming started in April 1971, only ten days after Russell finished work on The Devils.
During filming Russell said the film was "supposed to be a holiday after The Devils—just entertainment. It's turned out to be the hardest picture I've ever made."

Leads

Twiggy
Ken Russell was friends with the model Twiggy, who wanted to get into films—in 1968 they announced she would star in The Wishing Tree directed by Russell but it was not made.
Twiggy had been one of the most famous models in the world but had retired 18 months before the film.

Twiggy had seen a revival of The Boy Friend and suggested that Russell direct her in a film version. Russell says he told a journalist as a joke that he was doing it, and an executive from MGM contacted him saying they had the rights for years but could never figure out how to do it. The executive felt that the "twenties stylisation" of the musical worked on stage but not on film. "It's mannered and stilted and the cardboard characters never come alive". They asked Russell if he was interested in trying an adaptation and he agreed. "Honestly that's how it all came about," said Russell.

MGM were concerned about Twiggy but Russell said "give me three months and I'll have her dancing like Ginger Rogers and singing like Judy Garland."

Her boyfriend and manager, Justin de Villeneuve, acted as producer. "Justin swears she can do anything," said Sandy Wilson before filming began, "and I would think he's probably right."

"The dancing nearly killed me," said Twiggy.

Christopher Gable
The male lead was Christopher Gable, who, suffering from a chronic condition in his feet, had left the Royal Ballet to pursue a career in acting.

Gable recalled: "Twiggy was just great; she may be skinny but she's tough. The musical itself was not enjoyable. By a musical's very nature, one has to be relentlessly cheery, the kind of person who always smiles, and, therefore, always dances. After four months, you don't feel like it."<ref name="gable">"A dancer escapes", Stephen Godfrey, The Globe and Mail', 16 November 1977.</ref>

Music
Sandy Wilson's 1920s-style music was arranged by Peter Maxwell Davies, who had provided the score for The Devils. Davies added music for a dream sequence.
Russell added two numbers from Singing in the Rain especially for Twiggy, "You Are My Lucky Star" and "All I Do Is Dream of You".

Filming
Filming took place over eighteen weeks, finishing in September. The big production numbers were shot at Elstree Studios in London and the rest at an old theatre in Portsmouth.

"I know The Boy Friend will be one of the greatest musicals of all time," said Russell. "I only have 24 girls instead of 300 but the Busby Berkeley musical numbers and dream sequences will knock you out. I'm directing it like a tacky stage play in the provinces that is being visited by a big Hollywood director. You see the big fantasies as he visualises them in his head. It will be fantastic!"

"His main problem is containing himself," said associate producer Harry Benn. "He has so many ideas going through that brain of his, his problem - and ours - is to contain himself."

Russell said during filming that de Villeneuve was feeling jealous and left out, affecting Twiggy's performance, so Russell tried to keep him away from the set. He says at one stage de Villeneuve threatened to pull Twiggy out of the film. This caused tension between Russell and Twiggy, although they would eventually reunite while Twiggy ended her relationship with de Villeneuve in 1973.

When the film was over Russell said "I'd always wanted to do" a musical "but never again. It's like trying to rebuild the pyramids when everyone's forgotten how they did it. The simplest things confounded us like those marvelous dark glossy Hollywood floors. We had to try so many materials to paint the floors. We'd get the color the girls would dance on them and they'd be ruined."

De Villeneuve wanted to star Twiggy and Tommy Tune in Gotta Sing, Gotta Dance, but the film was never made. Twiggy and De Villeneuve broke up in 1973. Twiggy and Tune re-teamed on the popular show My One and Only.

 MGM edits 
James Aubrey, head of Metro-Goldwyn-Mayer, ordered 25 minutes be cut from the film for its U.S. release. Michael Laughlin, director of the film Chandler, which also was cut by Aubrey, claimed Russell said he was going to Los Angeles to "murder Jim Aubrey". Russell denied this, claiming to have said he was going to Los Angeles to murder film critic Rex Reed (who had been critical of Russell), and pointed out he was making his next film, Savage Messiah, for MGM. He said if Aubrey wanted to cut the film that was his prerogative.

Among the material cut by MGM for the U.S. release was:
 two songs: "It's Nicer in Nice" and "The You-Don't-Want-to-Play-with-Me Blues"
 a seven-minute sequence where the character played by Twiggy imagines the entire cast in a bacchanal
 a running gag involving the wife (Anne Jameson) of a two-timing actor

Russell wrote the cuts meant "all the relationships in the last reel became completely meaningless."

He  later claimed he should have cut the film "during the script stage but, determined to be faithful to the original show, I kept in everything! It was left to MGM, who financed the film, to do the job for me. A gorilla in boxing gloves wielding a pair of garden shears could have done a better job."

Russell was just one of several directors during this time who complained of MGM and Aubrey recutting  their films.

Sandy Wilson said in a 1994 interview that he disliked the film. "I recognise some of the tunes. If it made a star out of Twiggy, well... but she's faded out long since. To give Russell his due, it didn't belong on the screen at all."

Russell later wrote of the film in his 1994 memoirs The Lion Roars:
Despite the big Busby Berkeley routines, the novelty value of the stage show, the great singing and dancing by the cast... plus the brilliant designs of Shirley Kingdon and Tony Walton, the film was a flop. The acting was too broad, the gags too laboured and the pacing too slow. I should have cut it during the script stage, but, determined to be faithful to the original show, I kept in everything!
In 1987, a version of the film was released with the 25 minutes restored.

Reception
The film had simultaneous premieres in London and New York. The film had a debut premiere at the Fox Theater in Atlanta. Models wore period fashions from the film on stage to introduce the film. Actress Susan Hayward made an appearance on stage during introductions.

Box office
In January 1972 the Los Angeles Times reported the film was "raking in big grosses already in New York and LA." In October 1972, Russell said "what the public wants is sex and violence, not family films. I made The Boy Friend and no one went to see it." However, by that stage the film had earned $3 million in the US.

In June 1974 Jack Haley Jr of MGM said the film had made the studio "several hundreds of thousands of dollars" in profits. He put this down to the fact that the film only cost $2.2 million. "The property wasn't that expensive because it had a nice score but no hits. Twiggy was an international personality but other than her there were no major expenses for talent." It also helped the film was made in England. Haley thought if it had been made in Hollywood "the cost would have run to more than $5 million on which MGM would have taken a good sized loss."

Critical reception
Variety praised the film, observing: “If for nothing else – but film has more – Ken Russell’s screen translation of The Boy Friend is a beautiful vehicle for Twiggy, a clever young performer. It is delightful entertainment, novel and engaging.”

Roger Ebert of the Chicago Sun-Times wrote "Even when he’s not deliberately doing Berkeley takeoffs, (Ken Russell's) camera is so joyless that it undermines every scene".

Roger Greenspun wrote in The New York Times: "I am surprised to find that it is rather greatly to my taste; partly because it is often as witty as it is elaborate, partly because it works its variations on the fully recognizable and still quite wonderful Sandy Wilson words and music, and partly because it is supported by a charming and energetic cast".

In 1973, Fred Astaire said "I don't like it when they rib the old movies and make them look silly," specifically referring to The Boy Friend. However, according to director Richard Quine Astaire "fell in love with" Twiggy watching the film and recommended that Quine use Twiggy in W (1974).

In June 1987, Los Angeles Times film critic Kevin Thomas reviewed the restored version, declaring “It’s a delight, one of the high points of Russell’s extravagantly uneven career. “ 

In a 2003 article for Turner Classic Movies, Felicia Feaster writes: “Despite its many charms, The Boy Friend is often seen as an inferior film to Russell's ‘serious’ dramas … But there is no denying Russell's wholly original and inventive self-reflexive approach to classic Hollywood musicals. Not content to merely honor those films, Russell also gives The Boy Friend a modern touch by introducing British class tension, hints of lesbianism, bawdy physical comedy and a telling comparison of film and stage craft… showing how in the moments of film fantasy that anything is possible, as opposed to the stage where rules of gravity and reality weigh more heavily. Much of the criticism…may also be due to a badly edited American release… which negatively influenced perceptions of this utterly magical film.”

Rotten Tomatoes gives the film 83%, based on 12 reviews.

Awards and nominations
The National Board of Review voted Ken Russell best director, and Twiggy won two Golden Globe Awards as best newcomer and best actress (musical/comedy).

The film was nominated for the Academy Award for Best Music, Adaptation and Original Song Score; Fiddler on the Roof'' won the award.

References

Notes

External links
 
 
 
 

1971 films
1971 comedy films
1970s English-language films
1970s musical comedy films
British musical comedy films
EMI Films films
Films about musical theatre
Films based on musicals
Films directed by Ken Russell
Films featuring a Best Musical or Comedy Actress Golden Globe winning performance
Films shot at EMI-Elstree Studios
Films set in the Roaring Twenties
Metro-Goldwyn-Mayer films
1970s British films